It Had To Be You is a 2000 romantic comedy film starring Natasha Henstridge and Michael Vartan.

Plot
Two strangers meet and fall in love during the weekend that they are planning their respective weddings.

Cast
 Natasha Henstridge
 Michael Vartan
 Michael Rispoli

Production
In January 1998, it was announced Michael Vartan had been cast as the co-lead opposite Henstridge.  Despite being filmed in 1998, it was not until 2001 the film was acquired for distribution by Regent Entertainment.

References

External links
 

2000 films
American romantic comedy films